John Hawkes is an Australian Thoroughbred racehorse trainer who is notable for heading:
 the national trainers' premiership ten times
 the Sydney premiership nine times (1993/94, 94/95, 95/96, 97/98, 98/99, 99/2000, 2003/04, 05/06, 06/07)
 leading Group One trainer six times 
 leading stakes-winning trainer nine times.

Hawkes started in the racing industry in Adelaide as an apprentice jockey.  

From 1989 to the mid 2000s, John Hawkes managed stables in Adelaide, Brisbane, Sydney and Melbourne for Bob and Jack Ingham.

In 2004 Hawkes was inducted into the Australian Racing Hall of Fame. He is also inducted into the South Australian Racing Hall of Fame.

In 2007 Hawkes left the Ingham operation and has subsequently trained in partnership with his sons Michael and Wayne.

Notable horses and victories

Hawkes has trained, or co-trained, a large number of high-class horses, including:
  
 Accomplice, winner of the 1997 Doomben 10,000
 All Too Hard, winner of the 2012 Caulfield Guineas and 2013 All Aged Stakes
 Arena, winner of the 1998 Victoria Derby
 Cameronic, winner of the 1988 Goodwood Handicap 
 Chautauqua
 Cross Swords, winner of the 1994 Sydney Cup
 Divine Profit, winner of the Caulfield Guineas
 Fiumicino, winner of the 2009 The BMW 
 Freemason
 Galena Boy, winner of the 1975 Victoria Derby
 Inference, winner of the 2017 Randwick Guineas
 Leebaz, winner of the 2015 and 2016 A D Hollindale Stakes and 2016 Easter Cup
 Little Papoose, winner of the 1972 South Australian Oaks
 Lonhro, Australian Horse of the Year in 2003/04 and winner of 11 Group One races including the 2001 Caulfield Guineas, 2002 Yalumba Stakes, the 2003 and 2004 George Ryder Stakes and the 2004 Australian Cup
 Lord Galaxy, winner of the 1986 Goodwood Handicap
 Love Conquers All, winner of the 2010 Missile Stakes, 2011 Betfair Stakes and 2011 The Shorts (ATC)
 Maluckyday
 Mentality
 Messene
 Mighty Manitou, winner of the 1982 AJC Sires Produce Stakes
 Mossfun, winner of the 2014 Golden Slipper Stakes
 New Logic
 Niello
 Niwot, winner of the 2012 Sydney Cup
 Octagonal, Australian Horse of the Year in 1995/96 and winner of 10 Group One races including the 1995 Cox Plate, 1996 Australian Derby, Tancred Stakes
 Over
 Paratroopers
 Pride Of Ingenue
 Railings, winner of the 2005 Caulfield Cup
 Real Saga
 Runyon, winner of the 1975 Perth Cup
 Star Turn
 Toltrice, winner of the 1972 The Thousand Guineas, Wakeful Stakes and VRC Oaks 
 Viscount

See also

 Thoroughbred racing in Australia

References 

1949 births
Australian racehorse trainers
Australian Thoroughbred Racing Hall of Fame inductees
Living people